Maurice B. Stein (1936 in Bloomsburg, Pennsylvania – 1994) (also known as Morry) was the owner of Camp Echo Lake (New York), a summer camp for mostly grade school students. He was the owner for over 30 years, along with his wife, Amy Medine.

Stein was a 1958 graduate of Brandeis University. He received an M.B.A. from the University of Chicago in 1960. He worked several years in business before buying Camp Echo Lake in 1964.

Stein was former president of the American Camping Association and its New York section as well as a former president of the New York State Camp Directors Association.

Camp Echo Lake business 
At the age of 28 years, Stein bought Camp Echo Lake from his wife's parents, who founded it in 1946.

Death 
Stein, at the age of 58, died on Monday, October 31, 1994. in the crash of an American Eagle commuter flight 4184 plane near Roselawn, Ind. At his death, Stein was en route to his home in Hartsdale, New York after working on a fund-raising program for underprivileged children at the American Camping Association in Martinsville, Ind.

References 

1936 births
1994 deaths
Brandeis University alumni
University of Chicago Booth School of Business alumni
People from Hartsdale, New York